Agranov (masculine) or Agranova (feminine) is a Russian last name. It derives from the Russian first name Gran (from the Latin word meaning grain), which transformed into the last name Granov. That last name transformed into "Agranov", as the latter is easier to pronounce.

People with the last name
David Agranov, actor who played Paul McNerney in Just Married, a 2003 American romantic comedy
Yakov Agranov (1893–1938), first Chief of the Soviet Main Directorate of State Security and a deputy NKVD chief

Fictional characters
Osip Agranov, character from the American crime drama series True Detective

References

Notes

Sources
Ю. А. Федосюк (Yu. A. Fedosyuk). "Русские фамилии: популярный этимологический словарь" (Russian Last Names: a Popular Etymological Dictionary). Москва, 2006. 

Russian-language surnames
